Intruder is the nineteenth studio album by English musician Gary Numan, released on 21 May 2021 by BMG and The End. It entered UK Albums Chart at number two, on 28 May 2021.

Album concept 
Intruder is a concept album with an apocalyptic theme, and the point of view of an anthropomorphised Earth's anger towards its human inhabitants due to environmental degradation. “The planet sees us as its children now grown into callous selfishness, with a total disregard for its wellbeing, it feels betrayed, hurt, and ravaged. Disillusioned and heartbroken it is now fighting back." Numan explained in an interview.  "Essentially, it considers humankind to be a virus attacking the planet. Climate change is the undeniable sign of the Earth saying enough is enough, and finally doing what it needs to do to get rid of us, and explaining why it feels it has to do it.” Numan stated that "The idea behind the album actually came from a poem called “Earth” that my youngest daughter Echo wrote. She wrote the poem about the planet being upset, and why it was upset". The original poem is included inside the sleeve of the vinyl edition of the album.

Critical reception 
Intruder received an overall score of 77/100 from 8 reviews on Metacritic, indicating "generally favorable reviews". One reviewer called Intruder "one of the finest albums of his career", NME describing the album as "fresh and ambitious" and "thrillingly relevant", and another citing it as one of Numan's "most interesting albums". Paste magazine said "the bracing new climate-change-conscious Intruder—is sketching clear charcoal renderings of the charnel house that awaits us". Songwriter Universe said the album is "an ambitious, compelling collection of songs with a unifying theme". Riff Magazine said the album is "a science fiction soundtrack about the impending climate catastrophe that doesn't need a movie to get its urgent point across." A number of the reviewers noted that Intruder was a sequel to his previous album both musically (with a similar blending of synthesizer-heavy Industrial rock with elements of middle eastern music, (the latter notably including contributions by Gorkem Sen playing the Yaybahar)), and also by theme, which is a "complementary narrative" to Savage (Songs from a Broken World).

Intruder entered the UK album chart at number two, on 28 May 2021, but it dropped to number sixty-three the following week and dropped off the chart after that.

Track listing

Personnel
 Gary Numan – vocals, keyboards
 Ade Fenton – keyboards, programming, mixing, production
 Steve Harris – guitars
 Tim Slade – bass
 Gorkem Sen – strings (Yaybahar)
 Gazelle Twin – backing vocals
 Persia Numan – backing vocals
 Raven Numan – backing vocals
 Nathan Boddy – mixing
 Matt Colton – mastering

Charts

References 

2021 albums
Gary Numan albums